George Wadsworth may refer to:

George Wadsworth (politician) (1902–1979), British Liberal politician and businessman
George Wadsworth (diplomat) (1893–1958), United States diplomat